The Cancer Act 1939 is an Act of Parliament of the United Kingdom passed in 1939 to: 
 make further provision for the treatment of cancer;
 to authorise the Minister of Health to lend money to the National Radium Trust;
 to prohibit certain advertisements relating to cancer; 
 and for purposes connected with the matters aforesaid. 

As of December 2014, the sole remaining provision is in respect of advertising to treat or cure cancer, all other provisions having been repealed or subsumed into other legislation. The Act does not apply in Northern Ireland.

Advertising 

The Act's most notable provision is a clause prohibiting taking any part in publication, except under specified conditions, of advertisements that "offer to treat any person for cancer, or to prescribe any remedy therefor, or to give any advice in connection with the treatment thereof". Prosecutions do take place, but are rare.

The expression "advertisement" includes any notice, circular, label, wrapper or other document, and any announcement made orally or by any means of producing or transmitting sounds.

The Act provides for exceptions in making material available to registered medical and nursing personnel and pharmacists, and for material produced by hospitals and local authorities.

Prosecutions under the Act 

According to an answer given in the House of Commons on 12 June 2014 there were 21 convictions under the Act between 1984 and 2013, and from then until 12 June 2014 there have been another four.

Convictions include:
 Jerry Sargeant "was found guilty of four counts of taking part in the publication of an advertisement containing an offer to treat a person for cancer relating to three pages on his business website and one video on YouTube" and his company, Star Magic Limited, was found guilty of two counts at his trial in March 2017. He was fined £4,700 at Westminster Magistrates Court on 8 November 2017.
 Steven Cook, fined £750 with costs of £1,500 in September 2014 for implying that colloidal silver could cure cancer – the case was brought by Essex Trading Standards.
 Stephen Ferguson, fined £1,750 with £2,500 costs and £120 victim surcharge in May 2014 for claiming that protein shakes and vitamin supplements had cured cancer in two of his patients – case brought by Westminster Trading Standards.
 Errol Denton, fined £1,000 for each of 9 offences, with costs of £9,821 and a victim surcharge of £100 in March 2014 for claiming that live blood analysis, lifestyle changes and herbs could cure cancer – case brought by Westminster Trading Standards.
 Adrian Pengelly, fined £600 with £2,000 costs and £15 victim surcharge in March 2010 for offering distance healing to cure cancer – case brought by Hereford Trading Standards.
 Donna Sims, given a two-year conditional discharge with costs of £1,100 in August 2009 for offering herbal remedies for cancer – case brought by Gloucestershire Trading Standards.
 Healthwize UK, fined £2,000 with £2,235 costs in March 2009 for selling ellagic acid with claims that it could inhibit the growth of cancer cells – case brought by Derbyshire Trading Standards.
 Andrew Harris, who sold Triamazon via the Internet, received a two-year conditional discharge with £350 costs in September 2008 – case brought by Trafford Trading Standards.

References

External links 

United Kingdom Acts of Parliament 1939
Oncology
Advertising in the United Kingdom
Cancer in the United Kingdom
Acts of the Parliament of the United Kingdom concerning healthcare
Advertising regulation
Medical regulation in the United Kingdom